Richard Digance (pronounced DYE-jance; born 24 February 1949) is an English comedian and folk singer.

Early life 
Digance was born in Plaistow, East London. After his family moved to nearby East Ham, he attended Vicarage Lane Primary School and then Thomas Lethaby Secondary Modern. After gaining two A-Level passes in English Literature and Modern British History, he moved to Glasgow, where he studied mechanical engineering during which time he was inspired by Billy Connolly.

Career 
In the 1970s, he toured the United States. Though failing to make much of a name, he supported Steve Martin, whilst in Britain he also supported Jethro Tull on two British tours, Steeleye Span, Tom Jones, Elkie Brooks, Supertramp and Joan Armatrading.
From 1974-78 Doug Morter, guitarist and singer with Hunter Muskett joined Digance as accompanist on vocals and guitar.

Richard Digance began his TV career on Sound of The City for Thames TV, produced by Richard Newman, in the early 1970s. This debut appearance was followed by The Old Grey Whistle Test and then the Today programme. The Old Grey Whistle Test was his only BBC TV appearance, except for appearing on The Ronnie Corbett Show years later, and then link-man for BBC2 coverage of The Cambridge Folk Festival. He then became a regular contributor on The 6 o'clock Show with Michael Aspel. He had to wait over a decade to be given his own show.

His first own TV Special was in 1985 for Thames TV, A Dabble With Digance. After the success of this special he was signed to TVS in Southampton after being a studio warm-up act there for Matthew Kelly and this first series of six programmes screened on Thursday nights. He also filmed a pilot with, Chris Barrie who went on to star in Red Dwarf.

Digance left for London Weekend Television under Greg Dyke and filmed numerous Saturday night TV Specials for ITV. His guests included Status Quo, Brian May, Elkie Brooks, The Moody Blues, Marc Cohn, Buffy St Marie, Joe Pasquale, Juan Martin, Julia Fordham, Chris de Burgh and many others. An additional series with Jim Davidson Wednesday At 8 made him a popular guest during this period from 1985 to 1995. His guest-spots are almost endless; Surprise Surprise with Cilla Black - The Gloria Hunniford Show - The Jim Davidson Show - Des O'Connor Show - Live From Her Majesty's - Live From Piccadilly - Summertime Special with Michael Barrymore - Live From The Palladium with Roy Orbison Magpie - Celebrity Snooker and Fish o'Mania with Steve Davis - Pebble Mill At One - Saturday Night At The Mill - That's Entertainment with Kenny Everett and Julian Clary - Crosswits - The Tom O'Connor Show - The Parkinson Show with Tommy Steele and many more. He received a BAFTA Nomination as TV Entertainer Of The Year.

He came to more public attention as a regular turn on the popular Sunday evening Live from... (Her Majesty's/the Piccadilly/the Palladium) variety series (produced by LWT for ITV) and also on Summertime Special, a variety showcase of the 1980s.

He is known for his television one-hour specials, starting in 1985 with A Dabble of Digance. Abracadigance was a series of four shows in 1988. The 1992 show, Richard Digance's Greatest Bits, recorded at the Brighton Dome, included some of his most popular routines from stage and screen, including the "Nursery Rhymes", "Remembers" and "Jungle Cup Final".

Appearances on TV Specials included HRH The Prince of Wales Princes Trust Galas at the London Palladium with Elton John and Robin Williams - All At Sea, again before HRH The Prince of Wales - Christmas Eve Forces Special from The Berlin Wall and The Zeebrugge Disaster Concert at The London Palladium.

In the next decade he made two series for Carlton Westcountry TV visiting villages in a Morris Traveller and using locals as guests and remains the only entertainer to perform a TV show from a prison, Dartmoor.

Digance also had a BBC Radio career through the 1980s with his show 'A Digence Indulgence' which had a year 7 run up until the summer of 1987.

He has released 43 albums and 20 published books. 

He is a regular guest in 'Dictionary Corner' on the Channel 4 game show Countdown, nearly 200 appearances.

In October 2003, he received the Gold Award from the British Academy of Songwriters, Composers and Authors for his services to music.

He appeared at the Edinburgh Festival Fringe in 2013,[9] performing a solo show, and also his children's musical, War of the Worms, narrated by his daughter, Rosie. He performed 32 completely different shows across 32 nights.

Personal life 
Richard has two daughters, Polly and Rosie and two grandchildren, Izzy and Ellie. He now lives just outside Salisbury, Wiltshire. 
He semi-retired from live performance in 2021 and now only performs at his favourite theatres. This decision allowed him to concentrate on his writing, studio work, painting and acting as Musical Consultant for Ochre Moon, a website created by renowned blogger Charlotte Murray.

Discography
 England's Green and Pleasant Land (1974)
 Treading the Boards (1975)
 How the West was Lost (1975)
 In Concert (1975)
 Earl's A Winger (1977)
 Live At The Q.E.H. (1978)
 Commercial Road (1979)
 Homework (1984)
 A Digance Indulgence (1985)
 Richard Digance at the Fairfield Halls (1985)
 A Drop of Digance (1996)
 On a Serious Note (1996)
 Best of the Transatlantic Years (compilation CD) (1997)
 A Varied Selection (1998)
 Guitar Tunes (1998) 
 Richard Digance Compilation (2002)
 The New Richard Digance CD (2002)
 Back on Song (2005)
 Past and Present (2007)
 This is Great Britain (2013)
 The Toast of Christmas Past (2013)
 Golden Anniversary (2017)

References

External links
 Official website
 List of credits at BBC Online
 Richard Digance on Show Us Your Titters

1949 births
Living people
People from Plaistow, Newham
English male comedians
English television executives
English folk singers
Mercury Records artists
Chrysalis Records artists
20th-century English comedians
21st-century English comedians